Billy Wilson (10 July 1946 – 22 February 2018) was an English footballer (soccer player) who played professionally in England for 15 years before retiring to run The Pompey public house just outside Fratton Park. Born in Seaton Delaval on 10 July 1946 Wilson was a tough tackling left back who made nearly 250 league appearances for the Ewood Park club. An ever-present during their 1967-68 and 69-70 campaigns he was part of a close knit defence.

In January 1972 he moved to Portsmouth F.C for £25,000 and promptly scored his first league goal. He was to be a regular for four seasons (albeit a somewhat unconventional one) until he lost his place to Keith Viney during the 1976/77 campaign, after which he was very much more of a squad player.

He died on 22 February 2018 at the age of 71.

References

1946 births
2018 deaths
People from Seaton Delaval
Footballers from Northumberland
Blackburn Rovers F.C. players
Portsmouth F.C. players
English footballers
Association football defenders